In the first edition of the tournament, Simona Halep defeated wild card Andrea Petkovic in the final, 6–3, 6–3, to claim her first WTA singles title.

Seeds

Draw

Finals

Top half

Bottom half

Qualifying

Seeds

Qualifiers

Lucky losers 
  Yuliya Beygelzimer

Qualifying draw

First qualifier

Second qualifier

Third qualifier

Fourth qualifier

References 
 Main draw
 Qualifying draw

Nurnberger Versicherungscupandnbsp;- Singles
2013 Singles
2013 in German tennis